Plaxton is a surname, common in Canada, and may refer to:

 Herbert Plaxton (1901–1970), Canadian ice hockey player
 Hugh Plaxton (1904–1982), Canadian ice hockey player
 Frederick William Plaxton, founder of the Plaxton bus and coach building company
 Roger Plaxton (1904–1963), Canadian ice hockey player
 William Plaxton (1843–1907), Canadian politician

Plaxton